Phenacolepas fischeri is a species of sea snail, a marine sea gastropod mollusk in the family Phenacolepadidae.

Description

Distribution

References

Phenacolepadidae
Gastropods described in 1881